Emanueli is a surname. Notable people with the surname include:

 Giovanni Antonio Emanueli (1816–1894), Italian painter
 Luigi Emanueli (1883–1959), Italian engineer

See also
 Liopropoma emanueli (or Cape Verde basslet), a species of basslet in the family Serranidae

Italian-language surnames
Patronymic surnames
Surnames from given names